No. 5 (Number 5) is the fifth album from the J-pop idol group Morning Musume, released on March 26, 2003.

Overview

No. 5 is the last studio album to feature second generation member Kei Yasuda and first generation member Natsumi Abe as full members of the group. Yasuda graduated later in 2003, and Abe graduated in early 2004.  It is also the first Morning Musume studio album to feature a former member as a returning guest artist, as Maki Goto guests on "Megami ~Mousse na Yasashisa~" and "Ganbacchae" (as well as appears on "Do It! Now", her last single as a member of the band).

Two of the songs, "Megami ~Mousse na Yasashisa~" and "Yes! Pocky Girls", are credited to two one-time Morning Musume spinoff groups, "Venus Mousse" and "Pocky Girls", respectively.  The songs originated as promotional songs for Pocky biscuit snacks and appeared in versions that are least one minute shorter on the Petit Best 3 compilation album in December 2002. The first pressing came in special packaging with a photobook and a special mini poster.

Track listing 
 "Intro"
 "Do it! Now"
 "Top!"
 
 
 
 
 
 "Yes! Pocky Girls (Original Long Version)"

Certification 
 Platinum (RIAJ)

References

External links 
 No.5 entry on the Hello! Project official website

Morning Musume albums
Zetima albums
2003 albums